Gemballa GmbH is an automobile manufacturing and tuning company based in Leonberg, Germany, specializing in customization and aftermarket parts mainly for Porsche cars. Gemballa was founded by and named after Uwe Gemballa in 1981.

In May 2010, the Gemballa factory was seized by German authorities and shut down following the disappearance of Uwe Gemballa who was later found dead in South Africa. CEO Andreas Schwarz and investor Steffen Korbach were able to buy the brand rights and name rights from Gemballa in August 2010 and refounded the company as Gemballa GmbH. In 2016, Steffen Korbach became the sole CEO of the company and Alexander Schwarz stepped down. Korbach reportedly also took over the shares in the company from his former partner Schwarz.

A  Gemballa model held the lap record for road cars at the Nürburgring in the late 1990s once, and again in 2001 when Wolfgang Kaufmann lowered it to 7:32:52 min. It was since beaten by a Porsche Carrera GT, by less than a second.

Notable cars

Avalanche, Cyrrus, and Mirage 
In the 1980s Gemballa created the Avalanche based on the Porsche 911/930 (Turbo 911 slant nose) and the Cyrrus (convertible) as well as the Mirage that was similar to the Avalanche. The cars were unique with large wide body kits, side strakes (similar to a Ferrari Testarossa), upgraded wheels, interiors, gauges, paint, Hi-Fi audio systems, etc. Some vehicles even used cameras instead of mirrors, technology far ahead of its time. Audio company Pioneer used Gemballa vehicles in their advertisements and brochures for several years. The prices for these vehicles were often mentioned as being incredibly expensive for the time period at US $250K-$375K+. Robert Van Winkle, also known as Vanilla Ice, was a famous owner of Gemballa Porsches.

In the 1990s Gemballa's body kits were more subtle compared to the 80s. They continued to perform engine modifications and opened up a US facility in California.

911 RS America 
In 2005 a white Gemballa 911 RS America led a parade of approximately 30 other RS Americas at the Porsche Parade in Hershey, PA. It was the largest gathering ever of Porsche RS Americas.

Mirage GT 
Introduced in 2007, the Mirage GT is a mid-engine sports car produced by Gemballa and based on the Porsche Carrera GT. The Stock Carrera GT only had two exhaust pipes so the additional two pipes in the Mirage GT are where the reverse and fog warning lamps used to be (they relocated the two lamps to beneath the rear diffuser). Other modifications include a roof mounted air-intake that goes into the engine bay, a Gemballa Sport Clutch, a rear wing with an electronic center section, a carbon fiber hardtop, carbon fiber body panels, Gemballa wheels and a redesigned front fascia, rear fascia and side skirts. At the time, company owner Uwe Gemballa said that a twin-turbo version of the Porsche Supercar was in the works. Modified Luxury & Exotics magazine described the car as "one of the finest automobiles we've ever featured." 25 Mirage GTs were produced in total.

Avalanche GTR 800 Evo-R 
The Gemballa Avalanche GTR800 EVO-R is a car based on the 911 (997) GT2. Like the title suggests, it produces about  thanks to two turbochargers and highly modified engine components. There are pictures and information released at www.gemballa.com, the Gemballa GmbH website.

GT 750 Aero 3 
Gemballa also has a modification based on the Porsche Cayenne Turbo. This produces around 750 brake horsepower. The modification is called GT 750 Aero 3. This modification is also available for the Cayenne's predecessor 955 model. The tune-up kit features exterior modification to enhance aerodynamic performance. Engine tuning is carried through revised turbochargers, coolers (oil and pressurized air IC) and a large collection of engine components including pistons and seals.

MIG-U1 
The Gemballa MIG-U1 is based on the Ferrari Enzo, in limited numbers. It is a custom made car for Mustafa and Ilyas Galadari from Dubai: Their initials form the Name "MIG".

Mistrale 
The 2011 Gemballa Mistrale, based on the Porsche Panamera Turbo, has 707 bhp. Only 30 will be built.

GT 
In 2011, Gemballa Racing was started and participated in the 2012 ADAC GT Masters series and in the 2012 24h Nürburgring where ex-F1 driver Nick Heidfeld drove for Gemballa Racing.

Current Gemballa cars
The actual Gemballa cars are predominantly based on Porsche and McLaren cars:

 Gemballa Avalanche based on Porsche 997 
 Gemballa Tornado based on Porsche Cayenne 
 Gemballa GT Aero 1/2/3 based on Porsche Cayenne   
 Gemballa Mirage GT based on Porsche Carrera GT
 Gemballa Mistrale based on Porsche Panamera 
 Gemballa GT based on Porsche 991 
 Gemballa GT based on McLaren MP4-12C 
 Gemballa MP4-12C GT3 based on McLaren MP4-12C GT3 (under Gemballa Racing division label)

Death of Uwe Gemballa
On February 17, 2010, it was reported that Uwe Gemballa had gone missing in Johannesburg, South Africa while on a business trip. In October 2010, Gemballa was found dead west of Pretoria, having been suffocated and wrapped in plastic. It is suspected that his murder was a result of a money laundering operation which turned against him. Others maintain that Gemballa was murdered because he had refused to participate in a criminal activity. On October 29, 2010, Thabiso Mpshe, 28, from Pretoria, pleaded guilty to charges related to his involvement in the murder of Uwe Gemballa in Johannesburg. Under the terms of the plea agreement, he was sentenced to 20 years in prison.

In 2015, three additional men, Thabo Mogapi, Kagiso Ledwaba and Garlond Holworthy, were also convicted of charges relating to the kidnap and murder of Gemballa. Their sentencing hearing is expected to begin on 30 November 2015. The mastermind is suspected to be Czech criminal fugitive Radovan Krejčíř.

Gemballa Racing (2011–present)
Gemballa established its racing division called Gemballa Racing in 2011, using McLaren MP4-12C GT3 vehicles instead of Porsches. They are scheduled to race in FIA GT3 European Championship in 2012.

References

External links
 Gemballa website
 Gemballa Racing website

Automotive motorsports and performance companies
Automotive companies established in 1981
Auto parts suppliers of Germany
1981 establishments in Germany
Companies based in Baden-Württemberg
Ferrari
Porsche
German auto racing teams
Auto tuning companies